C.E. Humphry (1843–1925), who often worked under the pseudonym "Madge", was a well-known journalist in Victorian-era England who wrote for and about issues relevant to women of the time. She wrote, edited and published many works throughout her career and is perhaps best known for originating what was known as the "Lady's Letter"-style column she wrote for the publication Truth, read throughout the British Empire. She was one of the first woman journalists in England.

The subject matter about which she wrote could be compared to that of Emily Post or Ann Landers.

Life

Background
Charlotte Eliza Humphry, née Graham, was born at Omagh, Co. Tyrone, on 12 July 1843, the daughter of Rev. James Graham and his wife Eliza (formerly Grayson, nee Raleigh). Her father was the Senior Curate of St Columb's Cathedral and Surrogate of the Diocese of Londonderry; he published a series of essays in opposition to Puseyite tractarianism and died when Charlotte was less than two years old. Her grandfather, Rev. John Graham (1774-1844), was a prominent figure in the Orange Order and historian of the Williamite War in Ireland. Her sister Frances married John Wylkins Coppin, brother of Louisa Coppin.

Education and early career
Charlotte was educated in Dublin. In adulthood she moved to London; by 1871 she was teaching English in a boarding school for girls near Paddington.  She then had a secretarial role on the Drawing Room Gazette, before in 1874 becoming editor of Sylvia's Journal. Soon Henry Du Pré Labouchère offered her the opportunity to pen a gossip column for women in Truth.

Marriage and family life
She married Joseph Albert Humphry on 5 March 1881. She afterwards lived in London where her daughter, Helen Pearl, was born in the following year.

Death
She died at Waverley Place, St John's Wood, on 2 April 1925.

Journalistic career 
Mrs. Humphry, a.k.a. Madge, began writing the "Girl's Gossip" column in Truth in 1873 and continued it throughout her career. Mrs. Humphry was one of the first female journalists to write a regular column devoted to women's issues. At the beginning of her career, there were very limited spaces devoted to women in newspapers and magazines. However, by the 1890s the idea of women making a career in journalism was considerably more acceptable than it had been thirty years previously. By then, women writers had become more visible in mainstream periodicals and specialist women's magazines. As Humphry herself commented in an interview for Women’s Life:

The scope of women's work in the journalistic world is much greater now. When I first became a journalist only a few papers published ladies' letters, and these dealt principally with domestic servants, the management of babies, and similar subjects. Now women go in for golf, bicycling, and other games; in fact, the athletic girl is a new development, and as woman's world is widened, so is the field for women writers.

Others would later mimic her style. Humphry's columns regularly featured advice on domestic management, etiquette and manners, and getting on in English and foreign society. The articles also frequently contained recipes, which were "prepared by the very best cooks in England and on the Continent". By today's standards, these articles might be considered without focus since they often jumped from topic to topic, and would likely be found in the editorial section of a contemporary newspaper. A sample of her writing from 1887 in Truth can be found here.

She went on to write all the dress and fashion articles for the Daily News  and another "Lady's Letters" column for the Globe, two popular daily newspapers at the time. She was also the editor of Sylvia's Home Journal. It is likely that she sustained her work for most, if not all, of these periodicals and newspapers in addition to publishing several of her own books, including:

 The Book of the Home: A Comprehensive Guide on All Matters Pertaining to the Household, 1909, 6 volumes, Editor
 How to be Pretty Though Plain, 1899
 A word to women, 1898
 The Century Invalid Cookery Books, 1989
 Manners for men, 1897
 Manners for women, 1897

Madge's daughter, Helen Pearl Adam 
(Helen) Pearl Adam (1882-1957) was born on 25 April 1882. Pearl began her own career as a journalist in 1899 when she was seventeen. Ten years later, she married another newspaper writer, George Adam. The pair were correspondents in Paris during the First World War, where George Adam had been posted in 1912. There she edited International Cartoons of the War in 1916 and subsequently published her diary of the period under the title Paris Sees it Through. After the war, the couple remained in the city, where Pearl Adam met the writer Jean Rhys, allowing her to live in the Adams' flat, editing Rhys's first novel, Triple Sec, and introducing her to Ford Madox Ford. George Adam resigned from the Times in January 1921 but remained there working for American newspapers, while his wife wrote articles commissioned by the Evening Standard, the Observer and the Sunday Times, among others. They wrote together A Book about Paris (1927). George Adam died in Paris in 1930, and in the wake of this Pearl Adam returned to England, where she continued her work, which included writing the History of the National Council of Women of Great Britain in 1945. She died on 2 January 1957.

Comprehensive bibliography 

 Points Worth Noting for Women, 1918
 The Book of the Home: A Comprehensive Guide on All Matters Pertaining to the Household, 1909, 6 volumes, Editor
 Etiquette for every day, 1902 
 Manners for girls, 1901 
 Beauty Adorned, 1901
 Madge's Book of Cookery and Home Management, 1901
 How to be Pretty Though Plain, 1899
 A word to women, 1898 
 The Century Invalid Cookery Books, 1989
 Manners for men, 1897 
 Manners for women, 1897  
 Cookery Up-to-Date, 1896
 Housekeeping: A guide to domestic management, in one volume, 1893

References

Additional References 
The Colac Herald (Vic. : 1875 - 1918). Friday 4 October 1901. "TRUTH'S" MADGE 
New Zealand Newspaper, Star, Issue 7161, 27 July 1901, Page 3. AMERICAN V. ENGLISH MANNERS. 
Project Gutenberg, Link to A Word to Women, Mrs. C.E. Humphry. 
University of California, Information, Education, Technology.  Household Books Published in Britain. Listing of books classified under Humphry, Mrs Charlotte Eliza http://householdbooks.ucdavis.edu/authors/1310
Fraser, Hilary, Green, Stephanie, Judith, Johnston (2003). Gender and the Victorian Periodical. Cambridge University Press: UK.
The Sydney Morning Herald. 28 February 1906. How to be Pretty Though Plain. 
Humphry Review of "Beauty Adorned" Otago Witness, Issue 2475, 21 August 1901, Page 70.  The History of Godfrey Kince. "Beauty Adorned"
West Gippsland Gazette (Warragul, Vic. : 1898 - 1930) Oh! The Men. How They Dress. 
Helen Long (1993).  The Edwardian House: The Middle-class Home in Britain, 1880-1914.  Manchester University Press: UK.  
Star, Putanga 4322, 9 Hakihea 1893, Page 2. Literary Notes. London, 13 Oct. 
National Archives London University: London School of Economics, The Women's Library. The archive consists of manuscript diaries (1912-1914, 1950-1956), manuscript notebooks which include some of her own poetry (1900-1922), publications by Adams and photographs of visits to Paris (1906, 1915). 
Room, Adrian (2010) Dictionary of Pseudonyms: 13,000 Assumed Names and Their Origins: Fifth Ed. McFarland & Company Inc.: US.

External links
 
 

1925 deaths
English journalists
English women journalists
Year of birth uncertain